Orhantarctia is a genus of moths in the subfamily Arctiinae from Lesser Sundaland: Lombok and Flores. The genus was erected by Vladimir Viktorovitch Dubatolov and Yasunori Kishida in 2005.

Species
 Orhantarctia cymbalophoroides (Rothschild, 1910)
 Orhantarctia habibiei (Orhant, 1999)

References
  (2005). "New genera of Arctiinae (Lepidoptera, Arctiidae) from South and East Asia". Tinea. 18 (4): 307-314, Tokyo.

Spilosomina
Moth genera